Dr. James F. O'Gorman (born 1933) is a leading American architectural historian, author, lecturer, editor, and consultant who taught for many years at Wellesley College. O'Gorman received a B.Arch. degree from the School of Architecture at Washington University in St. Louis in 1956 and an M.Arch. from the University of Illinois, Urbana-Champaign, in 1961. He earned a Ph.D. in Art History from Harvard University in 1966.

O'Gorman is particularly known for his research and writing on the nineteenth-century American architects Henry Hobson Richardson, Frank Furness, Hammatt Billings, Isaiah Rogers, and Gervase Wheeler. He is also known for his popular introduction to architecture: ABC of Architecture. O'Gorman has retired from teaching and currently resides in Portland, Maine.

He was named a Fellow of the Society of Architectural Historians in 2007.

Books
O'Gorman, James F., ABC of Architecture, University of Pennsylvania Press, Philadelphia 1998, 
O'Gorman, James F., Accomplished in All Departments of Art: Hammatt Billings of Boston, 1818-1874, University of Massachusetts Press, Amherst 1998, 
O'Gorman, James F., The Architecture of Frank Furness, Philadelphia Museum of Art, Philadelphia 1973
O'Gorman, James F., editor, Aspects of American Printmaking, 1800-1950, Syracuse University Press, Syracuse 1988, 
O'Gorman, James F., Connecticut Valley Vernacular: The Vanishing Landscape and Architecture of the New England Tobacco Fields, University of Pennsylvania Press, Philadelphia 2002, 
O'Gorman, James F., H. H. Richardson: Architectural Forms for an American Society, University of Chicago Press, Chicago 1987, 
O'Gorman, James F., H. H. Richardson and His Office: Selected Drawings, David R. Godine, Boston 1974, 
O'Gorman, James F., Living Architecture: A Biography of H. H. Richardson, Simon & Schuster, NY 1997, 
O'Gorman, James F., On the Boards: Drawings by Nineteenth-century Boston Architects, University of Pennsylvania Press, Philadelphia 1989, 
O'Gorman, James F., Three American Architects: Richardson, Sullivan, and Wright, 1865-1915, University of Chicago Press, Chicago 1991, 
O'Gorman, James F., The Architecture of the Monastic Library in Italy 1300-1600, New York University Press, New York 1972
O'Gorman, James F., This Other Gloucester, Boston 1976
O'Gorman, James F., The Landscape & Architecture of Wellesley College, Wellesley 2000
O'Gorman, James F., The Perspective of Anglo-American Architecture, Athenaeum of Philadelphia,  Philadelphia 1995 
O'Gorman, James F., American Architects and Their Books to 1848, University of Massachusetts Press, Amherst 2001
O'Gorman, James F., The Makers of Trinity Church in the City of Boston, University of Massachusetts Press, Amherst 2004
O'Gorman, James F., Henry Austin, Wesleyan University Press, Middletown 2009

References

Living people
1933 births
American architecture writers
American male non-fiction writers
American art historians
American architectural historians
American biographers
Wellesley College faculty
Sam Fox School of Design & Visual Arts alumni
Writers from Maine
People from Windham, Maine
Harvard University alumni
Washington University in St. Louis alumni
University of Illinois School of Architecture alumni